The Alpe di Succiso is  a mountain in the northern Apennines, located in the trait between the Cerreto and Lagastrello Passes, with an altitude of 2,017 m. It has a pyramidal appearance, carved by several gorges.

The rivers Secchia and Enza, right affluences of the Po River, have their source in the Alpe di Succiso. The mountain is part of the National Park of the Appennino Tosco-Emiliano.

Mountains of Emilia-Romagna
Two-thousanders of Italy